Géza Gyóni (25 June 1884 – 25 June 1917) was a Hungarian war poet. He died in a Russian prisoner of war camp during the First World War.

Early life
Born Géza Áchim to "crusading Lutheran family" in the small village of Gyón, near Dabas, in Austria-Hungary. Gyóni was one of the seven children of a pastor of the Evangelical-Lutheran Church in Hungary.

After his younger brother died, Gyóni's mother became mentally ill and the future poet was sent to live with his uncle, who was also a Lutheran minister.

After he graduated from the high school in Békéscsaba, the future poet began studying in the Lutheran seminary at Pozsony. But he was also drawn to writing and also became a newspaper correspondent and adopted the name of his birthplace as a pseudonym.

Gyóni had to leave the seminary after he was injured while playing Russian roulette with a rival reporter. In the aftermath, he edited a rural newspaper for a time and then moved to Budapest to study economics.

His first collection of poetry, named simply Versek (Poems) was published in the same year, 1903. This marked a very low period in his life, in which Gyóni sought to free himself from his father's demands and even attempted suicide, before being transferred to an administrative course which led to a job in Budapest. In the city he was increasingly drawn to journalists and poets, contributing to the literary journal Nyugat and beginning a long rivalry with the contemporary leading poet of Hungary Endre Ady, who he criticized in his second collection, Szomorú szemmel (With sorrowful eyes) in 1909.

Military service
In November 1907, Gyóni was called up to the Austro-Hungarian Army, and spent eighteen months breaking rocks and building railway lines in Bosnia-Herzegovina, which he did not at all enjoy and which bred a very strong streak of pacifism in him. The "exercise" was finally called off in 1908.

In Szabadka, Gyóni met and fell in love with the woman whose memory and infidelity were to taunt him in the POW camps in Siberia.

During this time and the following two years he continued working on his poetry in Budapest, until he was recalled to active service during the Balkan Wars in 1912. In response, Gyóni wrote the great pacifist poem, Cézar, én nem megyek ("Caesar, I Will Not Go").

His works in this period were later collected following his death, and posthumously published in 1917 as Élet szeretője (Lover of Life).

War poet
After the police investigation into the assassination of Archduke Franz Ferdinand revealed the involvement of Serbian military intelligence chief Colonel Dragutin Dimitrijević, Gyóni, like many other Austro-Hungarians, accepted the Government's allegations of, "a plot against us," and the necessity of fighting, "a defensive war." Some Hungarian intellectuals felt that World War I provided an excellent opportunity to pay back the House of Romanov for Tsar Nicholas I's pivotal role in the defeat of the Hungarian Revolution of 1848.

Gyóni seemed initially to enjoy the soldier's life, regularly writing poetry which was sent back home from the front for publication.

According to Peter Sherwood, "Gyóni's first, still elated, poems from the Polish Front recall the 16th-century Hungarian poet Bálint Balassi's soldiers' songs of the marches, written during the campaign against the Turks."

During the Siege of Przemyśl, Gyóni wrote poems to encourage the city's defenders and these verses were published there, under the title, Lengyel mezőkön, tábortűz melett (By Campfire on the Fields of Poland). A copy reached Budapest by aeroplane, which was an unusual feat in those days.

In Hungary, the politician Jenő Rákosi, used the popularity of Gyóni's collection to set up Gyóni as a brave soldier-poet and as the paragon of the Hungarian poetic ideal, as opposed to Endre Ady, who was a pacifist. Meanwhile, Gyóni's poetry took an increasingly depressive turn.

According to Erika Papp Faber, "His leaning toward Socialism and his anti-militarist attitude were, for a brief time, suspended, as he was caught up in the general patriotic fervor at the outbreak of World War I. But once he experienced the horrors of war first hand, he soon lost his romantic notions, and returned to the more radical positions of his youth, as it evident in his further volumes."

One of his poems from this period, Csak egy éjszakára (For Just One Night), in which he calls for Hungary's war profiteers, industrialists, and armchair patriots to come and spend just one night in the trenches, became a prominent anti-war poem and its popularity has lasted well beyond the end of the First World War.

Prisoner of war
Gyóni was captured by the Imperial Russian Army after the surrender of Przemyśl in March 1915. He was permitted to remain with his younger brother Mihály Áchim, who had also been captured. They endured together the lengthy nine-month journey between POW receiving areas, travelling between Kiev, Moscow, Alatyr, Petropavlovsk, Omsk and finally to Krasnoyarsk in Siberia. It was in this camp that he learnt of the full actions of Jenő Rákosi, the politician who had been manipulating his verse for propaganda. Gyóni had only heard rumours before and was enraged by what he learned.

He went on to write perhaps his finest poetry in the quiet and boredom he found there and produced the collection Levelek a kálváriáról és más költemények (Letters from Golgotha and Other Poems) in 1916 which was published in Hungary, based on manuscripts sent through the lines.

According to Erika Papp Faber, "The framework of this volume is provided by his unfaithful sweetheart and is filled with homesickness and visions of reconciliation with her."

Death
Gyóni died in the camp on his 33rd birthday, shortly after having a psychotic breakdown in response to his brother's death on 8 June.

Gyóni wrote a poem in captivity which represented his attitude to life entitled Magyar bárd sorsa (A Hungarian bard's fate):

Legacy
Géza Gyóni's last collection, Rabságban (In Captivity), consists of poems that were brought back to Hungary by a fellow POW. It was posthumously published in 1919.

According to Erika Papp Faber, "Loránt Czigány, the literary historian, called Gyóni 'a war poet of considerable talent,' while others, among them László Cs. Szabó, observe that Gyóni was not as outstanding a 'singer of the trenches' as were some French and English poets of World War I. Be that as it may, Géza Gyóni is a writer whose entire life and writings reflect the events of his time and help in understanding that period of European history."

Géza Gyóni's anti-war poem Csak egy éjszakára ("For Just One Night"), remains very popular and is still taught in Hungarian schools. It has been translated into English by Canadian poet Watson Kirkconnell and by Hungarian American poet Erika Papp Faber.

Although Kirkconnell's translation renders Gyóni's poem into the same idiom as British war poets Siegfried Sassoon, Wilfred Owen, and Isaac Rosenberg, Erika Papp Faber's version is far more faithful to the original poem in Hungarian.

Collections
 1903 – Versek (Poems)
 1909 – Szomorú szemmel (With sorrowful eyes)
1914 – Lengyel mezőkön, tábortűz melett (By the campfire on Polish prairies)
1916 – Levelek a kálváriáról és más költemények (Letters from Calvary and Other Poems)
1917 – Élet szeretője (Lover of Life) (posthumous)
1919 – Rabságban (In Prison) (posthumous)

Literature
Cross, Tim, The Lost Voices of World War I, Bloomsbury Publishing, Great Britain: 1988.

References 

1884 births
1917 deaths
20th-century Hungarian poets
20th-century Hungarian male writers
20th-century Lutherans
19th-century Lutherans
Austro-Hungarian military personnel killed in World War I
Austro-Hungarian prisoners of war in World War I
Hungarian Lutherans
Hungarian male poets
Hungarian World War I poets
Lutheran poets
Poètes maudits
World War I prisoners of war held by Russia